Melodeon may refer to:

Melodeon (accordion), a type of button accordion
Melodeon (organ), a type of 19th-century reed organ
Melodeon (Boston, Massachusetts), a concert hall in 19th-century Boston
Melodeon Records, a U.S. record label in the 1960s
The Melodeon, a 1977 novel by Glendon Swarthout

See also
Foster Hall (Indianapolis, Indiana) or Melodeon Hall
Harmonium (disambiguation)
Melodion (disambiguation)